Jim Montague (born 11 June 1950) is an Irish boxer. He competed in the men's light welterweight event at the 1972 Summer Olympics.

References

1950 births
Living people
Irish male boxers
Olympic boxers of Ireland
Boxers at the 1972 Summer Olympics
Place of birth missing (living people)
Light-welterweight boxers